Teddese Lemi Urgesa (born 20 January 1999) is an Ethiopian track and field athlete who specializes in middle-distance running. He competed at the 2019 IAAF World Cross Country Championships in Aarhus, where he won a gold medal in mixed relay with the Ethiopian team. He represented Ethiopia at the 2019 World Athletics Championships, competing in men's 1500 metres. He also competed in the 1500 metres at the 2020 Summer Olympics.

References

Ethiopian male middle-distance runners
1999 births
Living people
World Athletics Championships athletes for Ethiopia
Athletes (track and field) at the 2020 Summer Olympics
Olympic athletes of Ethiopia
21st-century Ethiopian people